Praterstern  is a station on  and  of the Vienna U-Bahn. Above the U-Bahn station is the Wien Praterstern railway station, which is served by regional trains, and by lines S1, S2, S3 and S7 of the Vienna S-Bahn.

Both stations are located in the Leopoldstadt District. The U-Bahn station opened in 1981.

References

Buildings and structures in Leopoldstadt
Railway stations opened in 1981
1981 establishments in Austria
Vienna U-Bahn stations
Railway stations in Austria opened in the 20th century

de:U-Bahn-Station Praterstern